The Suseo–Pyeongtaek high-speed railway (formerly known as Sudogwon HSR Line), also known as Suseo–Pyeongtaek HSR,  is a high-speed rail line from Suseo station in southeast Seoul to a junction with the existing Gyeongbu high-speed railway in South Korea. The line was built to ensure southeast Seoul (or Gangnam area) and southern Gyeonggi-do have high-speed rail connections.

History

Origins of the project

While South Korea's first high-speed line, the Gyeongbu high-speed railway (Gyeongbu HSR) was in construction between Seoul and Busan, the government considered a second line from Seoul to Mokpo, the Honam high-speed railway (Honam HSR). The first feasibility study in 2003 came to the conclusion that the construction of a full line is not justified by demand, and proposed a two-stage construction. The first stage, to be realised by 2015, would involve two branches from the Gyeongbu HSR, one of which would lead to a second Seoul terminus at Suseo in the southeast part of the city. However, in plans made official in August 2006, the Suseo branch was no longer included.

The Suseo branch was re-launched as a separate project, the Metropolitan Area high-speed railway (initially the Suseo high-speed railway), on June 1, 2008, to improve traffic connections to two new housing development areas situated along the line in Dongtan.

Planning stage

The travel time from Suseo to Dongtan was foreseen to be 12 minutes. The target date for finishing the line was later moved ahead to 2014.

The basic design was completed on April 28, 2010. The government set out a timeplan, according to which detailed design was to commence immediately, and construction was to take place from the second half of 2011 until the end of 2014. The first detailed design contracts were awarded in September 2010.

Once the line is completed, the expected travel time will be 1 hour 59 minutes from Suseo to Busan via the Gyeongbu HSR, and 1 hour 49 minutes from Suseo to Mokpo via the Honam HSR.

Longer term plans
On September 1, 2010, the South Korean government announced a strategic plan to reduce travel times from Seoul to 95% of the country to under two hours by 2020.

In November 2020, MOLIT announced extension of Suseo–Pyeongtaek high-speed railway to Uijeongbu. However, no completion date for the extension was announced.

Stations

Rolling stock
 KTX-Sancheon Class 120000
 KTX-Sancheon Class 130000

Operation
The Suseo–Pyeongtaek high-speed railway is currently utilized by Super Rapid Train (SRT) high-speed rail service.

Notes

References

High-speed railway lines in Korea